Lacson Avenue is the principal northwest–southeast artery located in Sampaloc district in northern Manila, Philippines. It is a component of Circumferential Road 2 of the Manila arterial road network and N140 of the Philippine highway network.

Route description

Travelling south, traffic emerges from Yuseco Street at the junction with Oroquieta Street in Santa Cruz. It then widens as it crosses Tayuman and Consuelo Streets across SM City San Lazaro. From here, it becomes a component of both Circumferential Road 2 (C-2) and N140 highway. The road then intersects with Dimasalang Street and España Boulevard in Sampaloc, passing the University of Santo Tomas campus. The southern end of Lacson lies at the Nagtahan Interchange, where it continues south as Nagtahan Street towards Nagtahan Bridge and the districts of Pandacan, Paco, and Malate, where C-2 terminates, as Quirino Avenue.

History
The avenue was originally named Forbes Street or Governor Forbes Street, after William Cameron Forbes, governor-general of the Philippines, under whose administration the road was begun. It was extended south to meet Calle Nagtahan (Nagtahan Street) at the boundary of Sampaloc, San Miguel and Santa Mesa at the old Carriedo Rotonda, when the pontoon bridge of Nagtahan that connected it to Pandacan south of the Pasig River was built. Nagtahan Bridge was renamed to Mabini Bridge in 1967, while in 1971, Governor Forbes Street was renamed to Arsenio H. Lacson Street, after the former Manila mayor who served from 1952 to 1962.

Landmarks
These are ordered from its western end at Yuseco Street to its eastern end at Nagtahan Interchange:
 SM City San Lazaro
 Andalucia Basketball Court
 Dangwa flower market
 Hospital of the Infant Jesus (corner Laong Laan)
 Mercury Drug (corner Laong Laan)
 University of Santo Tomas
 University of Santo Tomas Hospital

 Dominican School of Manila
 Sampaloc Fire Station
 SM Savemore Nagtahan

References

Streets in Manila
Sampaloc, Manila